Austertana Chapel is a parish church of the Church of Norway in Deatnu-Tana Municipality in Troms og Finnmark county, Norway. It is located in the village of Austertana. It is one of the churches for the Tana parish which is part of the Indre Finnmark prosti (deanery) in the Diocese of Nord-Hålogaland. The white, wooden church was built in a long church style in 1958 by the architect Trond Dancke. The church seats about 144 people.

See also
List of churches in Nord-Hålogaland

References

Tana, Norway
Churches in Finnmark
Wooden churches in Norway
20th-century Church of Norway church buildings
Churches completed in 1958
1958 establishments in Norway
Long churches in Norway